In mathematics, the Toda bracket is an operation on homotopy classes of maps, in particular on homotopy groups of spheres, named after Hiroshi Toda, who defined them and used them to compute homotopy groups of spheres in .

Definition 
Suppose that

Then we get a (non-unique)  map 
  
. 
 . 
 
The map  is not uniquely defined up to homotopy, because there was some choice in choosing the maps from the cones.

There are also higher Toda brackets of several elements, defined when suitable lower Toda brackets vanish. This parallels the theory of Massey products in cohomology.

The Toda bracket for stable homotopy groups of spheres 
The direct sum

of the stable homotopy groups of spheres is a supercommutative graded ring, where multiplication (called composition product) is given by composition of representing maps, and any element of non-zero degree is nilpotent .

The Toda bracket is not quite an element of a stable homotopy group, because it is only defined up to addition of composition products of certain other elements. Hiroshi Toda used the composition product and Toda brackets to label many of the elements of homotopy groups.
 showed that every element of the stable homotopy groups of spheres can be expressed using composition products and higher Toda brackets in terms of certain well known elements, called Hopf elements.

The Toda bracket for general triangulated categories 

In the case of a general triangulated category the Toda bracket can be defined as follows. Again, suppose that 

Let  denote the cone of f so we obtain an exact triangle

The relation  implies that g factors (non-uniquely) through  as 

Then, the relation  implies that  factors (non-uniquely) through W[1] as 

for some b. This b is (a choice of) the Toda bracket  in the group .

Convergence theorem 

References 

.
 .
 .
 .

Homotopy theory